The Military ranks of Madagascar are the military insignia used by the Military of Madagascar. Being a former colony of France, Madagascar shares a rank structure alike to that of France.

Commissioned officer ranks
The rank insignia of commissioned officers.

Other ranks
The rank insignia of non-commissioned officers and enlisted personnel.

References

External links
 

Madagascar
Military of Madagascar